American recording artist Tila Tequila has released two extended plays, five singles, and five music videos. After being allegedly offered recording contracts from Jive, Interscope and will.i.am Music Group, she decided to stay independent and kept releasing music under her own labels StratArt and later, Little Miss Trendsetter.

Originally being the lead singer of bands Beyond Betty Jean and Jealousy, Tequila embarked on a solo career in 2007. Her debut single, "I Love U", received mixed reviews from music critics and failed to enter the Billboard Hot 100. However, it sold over 13,000 copies in its first week. Shortly after the release of her first single, Washington-based record label The Saturday Team released Tequila's debut EP, Sex (2007), which according to her was not authorized for release and was removed from most retailers. The record label sued Tequila over breaching her contract related to the album and subsequently made Sex available for digital purchase. Her second single, "Stripper Friends", failed both critically and commercially, selling less than 1,000 copies in its first week.

By 2010, Tequila decided to reinvent her image and changed her stage name to Miss Tila. Her first single released under the new moniker was "I Love My DJ", along with an explicit version of the song "I Fucked the DJ". Released under her newly established label Little Miss Trendsetter, the single received negative reviews and failed to be successful in charts. She followed with the release of her second EP, Welcome to the Darkside (2010), which marked a musical departure from her previous material, being influenced mainly by classical music and blues.

Extended plays

Singles

As lead artist

As featured artist

Guest appearances

Videography

Music videos

References

External links
 
 
 
 

Discographies of American artists
Pop music discographies